Myrmica specioides is a species of ant of the genus Myrmica.

References

Myrmica
Insects described in 1918